Musicians Institute (MI) is a private for-profit music school in Los Angeles, California. MI students can earn Certificates and – with transfer of coursework taken at Los Angeles City College – Associate of Arts Degrees, as well as Bachelor of Music Degrees in either Performance or Composition. The college was founded in 1977.

History

Founders Howard Roberts and Pat Hicks
Musicians Institute was founded as The Guitar Institute of Technology in 1977 as a one-year vocational school of guitarists and bassists.  Its curriculum and pedagogical style was shaped by guitarist Howard Roberts (1929–1992). Pat Hicks (né Patrick Carroll Hicks; born 1934), a Los Angeles music industry entrepreneur, was the co-founder of Musicians Institute.  He is credited for providing the organizational structure and management that rapidly transformed Howard Roberts' educational philosophy into a major music school.

Programs added under Roberts and Hicks include:
 1978: Bass Institute of Technology (BIT)
 1980: Percussion Institute of Technology (PIT)
 1987: Vocal Institute of Technology (VIT)
 1991: Keyboard Institute of Technology (KIT)
 1993: Recording Institute of Technology (RIT)
 1994: Bachelor of Music Degree

Early curricular offerings
At the time of its founding, formal education in rock and roll at institutions of higher learning was limited mostly to universities and conservatories offering jazz studies, which were few.  At the founding of the Musicians Institute, Jazz studies was, and is today, a strong component of the curricular offerings. In early days of the Musicians Institute, the demand for musicians and music industry professionals with comprehensive collegiate credentials in the field of contemporary music was low.  Yet, the demand for contemporary music professionals was high.  Roberts, when he founded the school, wanted to give aspiring rock and roll musicians a conservatory experience.  Nowadays, comprehensive music education in higher education, from bachelors to doctorates, covers rock and roll from several perspectives, including literature, musicology, history, performing arts, technology, business, and law. For musicians working towards degrees in performance, proficiency in rock and roll is standard, particularly for aspiring session musicians.

The rise of contemporary musicians holding comprehensive academic credentials over the last 50 years is partly the result of more universities offering programs in the field, which, in turn, has increased the demand for contemporary oriented music educators with academic credentials at universities.  Because the Musicians Institute was an innovator in rock and roll in higher education – and  years ago began offering bachelor of music degrees – its alumni are well-represented as educators of contemporary music at institutions of higher learning.

Japanese businessman Hisatake Shibuya (born 1937) bought the school in 1994 and Musicians Institute began developing new programs to keep abreast of the modern music industry. Programs added under Shibuya include:
 2000: Independent Artist Program (IAP)
 2000: Audio Engineering
 2000: Guitar Craft Academy (GCA)
 2002: Music Business Program (MBP)
 2016: DJ Performance and Production (DJP)
 2016: Associate of Science in Music Business (AS.MB)
 2017: MI Online (MIO)
 2018: Artist Producer and Entrepreneur (APE)
 2018: Master in Music Degree (MM)

On 25 August 2007, the Los Angeles City Council adopted a resolution declaring 25 August 2007, "Musicians Institute Day in the City of Los Angeles" in recognition of its achievements over three decades during its 30th anniversary celebration.  The resolution was presented by Eric Garcetti, seconded by Tom LaBonge, and passed by a vote of twelve to zero out of fifteen, three being absent.

Former institutional and division names 
Active names
 MI College of Contemporary Music™ (service mark & trade mark)
 MI Connects™ (service mark) – online talent resource for students and alumni
 MI Musicians Institute™
 Guitar Craft Academy™ – for the design, construction, and maintenance of guitars and basses

Trademark names of Campus Hollywood
 Tricycle Entertainment™ (service mark – abandoned in 2004)

Former names
 Guitar Institute of Technology (service mark – became inactive 22 June 1990)
 Vocal Institute of Technology (service mark – became inactive 19 May 1989)
 Bass Institute of Technology
 Percussion Institute of Technology
 Keyboard Institute of Technology
 Recording Institute of Technology (trademark – became inactive 5 December 2005)
 Film Institute of Technology (trademark – became inactive 5 December 2005)
 Encore Program
 World Institute of Percussion (launched in 1987)

Trademark notes

Academics 
The Musicians Institute offers instrumental performance programs for bass, drums, guitar, keyboard technology, and vocals. Music industry programs include audio engineering, Independent Artist Program, the Guitar Craft Academy and Music Business. The school offers Associate of Arts, Associate of Science, and Bachelor of Music degrees in addition to certificates.

The Institute of International Education, in its assessment of "Top 40 Specialized Institutions, 2009/10," from its publication, International Students: Leading Institutions by Institutional Type, ranked Musicians Institute 13 in the United States out of 40. Musicians Institute and its programs are registered by the state of California by the Bureau for Private Postsecondary Education. It has been an accredited institutional member of the National Association of Schools of Music (NASM) since 1981.

In 1992, new musicologist Robert Walser cited the Musicians Institute as one of the best-known schools for guitarist, one that has flourished outside the ivory tower, offering students broader professional training. But a trade-off, according to a review in the October 2012 issue of Performer Magazine, is that a lack of academic accreditation – specifically from the Western Association of Schools and Colleges – can make it challenging for students to transfer credits from MI to academic institutions. To meet the academic criteria for a Bachelor of Music Degree – 45 quarter units or 30 semester units in liberal arts – the Musicians Institute has a partnership with nearby Los Angeles City College (LACC) to study English, mathematics, natural science, social science, and humanities.  LACC is accredited by the Western Association of Schools and Colleges The Carnegie Foundation has designated the Musicians Institute as a "Special Focus Institute in Music."

Facilities and constituent institutions 
Facilities
When MI celebrated its 30th Anniversary in 2007, its facilities included over 75,000 square feet of studios, performance venues, classrooms, and practice rooms across several blocks in central Hollywood.  , the Musician's Institute Stage was added as a venue for the Annual Mayhem Festival.  December 2013, The ESP Company, LTD, unveiled plans to expand its Campus Hollywood complex of schools in Los Angeles.  From 2010 to 2013, ESP invested $47 million in new property and will expand its facility to exceed 180,000 square feet of adjoining buildings on or near Highland Avenue between Hollywood Blvd. and Sunset Boulevard.  The expansion is part of a reorganization and upgrade of existing Campus Hollywood properties that accommodate the Musicians Institute, Theatre of Arts, International Dance Academy, and Elegance International.  The new facilities will include a performance venue, student dormitory, and parking lots. The Hollywood Campus constituent institutions will become more integrated with one another.

Constituent institutions of Campus Hollywood, Inc. – Hisatake Shibuya, President
 Musicians Institute – Hisatake Shibuya, President
 Theatre of Arts, 1536 N. Highland Avenue, Hollywood, an acting school founded in 1927 – Hisatake Shibuya, President
 Elegance International, 1622 N. Highland Ave., a school for professional makeup artists – Hisatake Shibuya, President
 Los Angeles College of Music, 300 South Fair Oaks Ave., Pasadena, California – Hisatake Shibuya, President
 International Dance Academy Hollywood, 6755 Hollywood Blvd., Suite 200 Hollywood – Hisatake Shibuya, President

International sister educational institutions
 MI Japan (ja) – Tokyo, Osaka, Nagoya, Sendai and Fukuoka – Hisatake Shibuya, President
 UTB Video Academy (ja), Chiyoda, Tokyo, founded in 1998 under the auspices of United Television Broadcasting Systems, Inc. (ja)
 ESP Entertainment, Kita-ku, Osaka – Hisatake Shibuya, President

Other entities closely held by Hisatake Shibuya
 Hollywood Entertainment ESL, founded as a California corporation in 2012, active – Hisatake Shibuya, President
 ESP Investment Holdings, Inc., founded as a California corporation in 2010, active – Hisatake Shibuya, President
 ESP Gakuen, founded as a Japan corporation in 2001, registered as a foreign non-profit corporation in California, active – Hisatake Shibuya, President
 Schecter Guitar Research, acquired by Shibuya in 1987 – Hisatake Shibuya, President
 ESP Company, Limited, doing business as ESP Guitars, founded by Shibuya in 1975 – Hisatake Shibuya, President
 United Television Broadcasting Systems, Inc. (ja), a Japanese language television station based in Los Angeles and syndicated in Japan
 E.S.P. Shibuya Enterprises, Inc., founded as a California corporation in 1998, active – Hisatake Shibuya, President

Inactive entities that were closely held by Hisatake Shibuya
 Tricycle Records, Inc., founded as a California corporation in 2001, dissolved – Hisatake Shibuya, President
 ESP Co., LTD., doing business in California as ESP Real Estate Investment, Inc., registration surrendered – Hisatake Shibuya, President
 Entertainment Enterprises Hollywood, Inc., founded as a California corporation, dissolved – Hisatake Shibuya, President
 CHMG, Inc., founded as a California corporation, no longer active – Hisatake Shibuya, President
 Hollywood Pop Academy, Inc., founded in 2003 as a California corporation, no longer active – Hisatake Shibuya, President

Musicians Institute Press 
The Musicians Institute Press is a division of the Musicians Institute, and is focused on instructional publications – print and video – by instructors of guitar, bass, drums, vocals, and film editing, audio engineering, composition, arranging, musicology, music theory, sight reading, sight singing, and the entertainment business.  The publications are distributed by the Musicians Institute and Hal Leonard Corporation Performing Arts Publishing Group. Since 1997, the publishing imprint has been the "Musicians Institute Press."  Before that, from about 1982 to 1997, the imprint was "Musicians Institute Publications."

Notable faculty 
Faculty – current and former

Guitar
 Chris Broderick
 Dean Brown
 Joe Diorio
 Ron Eschete
 Brett Garsed
 Paul Gilbert
 Jude Gold
 Scott Henderson
 Steve Lynch
 Alex Machacek
 Pat Martino
 Doug Rappoport
 Howard Roberts
 Kevin Stevens
 Dale Turner
 Carl Verheyen
 Dave Weiner
 Keith Wyatt
 David Oakes
 Jamie Glaser
 Dave Hill
 Don Mock
 Joe Elliott
 Jennifer Batten

Bass guitar
 Tim Bogert
 Louis Johnson
 Stuart Hamm
 Bob Magnusson
 Chuck Rainey
 Alexis Sklarevski
 Greg Weiss (son of Larry Weiss)

Vocal
 Debra Byrd, Chair
 Anika Peress

Percussion
 Cengiz Baysal (tr)
 Efa Etoroma
 Chuck Flores
 Horacio Hernandez
 Thomas Lang
 Glen Sobel
 Kevin Stevens
 Ralph Humphrey

Keyboards
 Russell Ferrante
 Carl Shroeder
 Steve Weingart

Audio engineering
 TJ Helmerich

Music Industry, entrepreneurship
 Don Grierson
 Vicky Hamilton

Independent Artist program
 Lisa Harriton, Chair
 Marko DeSantis

Original Song Pre-Production
 Richie Zito

Guest instructors – current and former

Guitar
 Jimmy Boyle
 Kim Carroll
 Marty Friedman
 Steve Vai

Bass guitar
 Jaco Pastorius
 Alphonso Johnson
 Patrick "Putter" Smith
 Gary Willis

Percussion
 Thomas Lang
 Dom Famularo

Guitar Craft Academy
 Howard R. Paul

Notable alumni 

 Sharon Aguilar
 Howard Alden
 Juan Alderete
 Shane Alexander
 Ioannis Anastassakis (el)
 Viktoria Andersson (sv)
 Mateus Asato
 John Ballinger
 Jennifer Batten
 Cengiz Baysal (tr)
 David Becker
 Jean Marc Belkadi
 Jeff Berlin
 Curt Bisquera
 Roberto Bossard (de)
 Jimmy Boyle
 Rolf Brendel (de)
 Gunnlaugur Briem (de)
 Bishop Briggs
 Norman Brown
 Jeff Buckley
  Bruce “Buck” Cameron
 Mike Campese
 Joacim Cans
 Sydnei Carvalho (pt)
 Giacomo Castellano (it)
 Alberto Cereijo (es)
 Jeffero Chan (zh)
 Hinson Chou Tsz Yeung (zh)
 Tanya Chua
 Alessandro Cortini
 Rivers Cuomo
 Demir Demirkan
 Marcus Deml (de)
 Michael Denning
 Francesco DiCosmo
 Douglas R. Docker
 Kenan Doğulu
 Greg Edmonson
 Peter Engberg (fi)
 Backa Hans Eriksson (sv)
 Emil Ernebro (sv)
 Gustav Eurén (sv)
 Big Chris Flores
 Kevin Fowler
 John Frusciante
 Shane Gaalaas
 Frank Gambale
 Greg Garman (es)
 Synyster Gates
 Isabell Gerschke (de)
 Terje Gewelt
 Roney "Giah" Giacometti
 Paul Gilbert
 Kat Graham
 Shruti Haasan
 Kenya Hagihara (ja)
 Scott Henderson
 Tony Hernando (es)
 Magos Herrera
 Jimmy Herring
 Rick Hill
 Allen Hinds (ja)
 Pelle Holmberg (sv)
 Gabriel Improta (pt)
 Cherno Jobatey (de)
 R.J.Jones (sv)
 Elli Kokkinou
 Dave Kushner
 Charles Olivier
 Wolfgang Laab (de)
 Lex Lang
 Daniel LeBlanc
 JinJoo Lee   
 Chris Letchford
 LaToya London
 Ray Luzier
 Matt McJunkins
 Christopher Maloney
 Guernica Mancini
 Paul Masvidal
 Meja
 Miri Miettinen (fi)
 Nikki Misery
 Teri Moïse (nl)
 Sonny Moorman
 Rafael Moreira
 Taps Mugadza
 OX (aka Samer El Nahhal)
 Ant Neely
 Ehsaan Noorani
 Stefan Olsdal
 Naoki Osawa (ja)
 Phillip Michael Pacetti
 Mimi Page
 Toss Panos
 Russ Parrish
 Patiparn Pataweekarn
 Marcus Paus
 Anel Paz
 Francisco Pachi Paz
 Rio (né Takeshi Kubo) (ja)
 Yannick Robert (fr)
 Constantine Roussos
 Mitsuhisa Sakamoto (ja)
 Ilya Salmanzadeh
 John Shanks
 Scott Shriner
 Kelly Simonz (ja)
 Marcus Singletary
 Ridho Slank (Indonesian Guitarist)
 Micah Sloat
 Chad Smith
 Ashwin Sood
 Jorma Styng (fi)
 Shane Theriot
 Carl August Tidemann
 Jasmine (né Chu Ting)
 Jerry Torr
 Les Townsend
 Steve Vai (Honorary)
 Leonardo Valvassori
 Eric Vandenberg
 Jaime Vendera
 Jakob Wahlberg (sv)
 Joyce Wahlberg
 Brooke White
 Mike Wolf
 Nick Wong (zh)
 Aguai Wu (zh)
 Keith Wyatt
 Yammy (ja)
 Jeff Young
 Bibi Zhou
 Tyler Zarzeka
 Jeff Zwart (nl)

Language codes
 hr = Croatian
 de = German
 el= Greek
 es = Spanish
 fi= Finnish
 fr= French
 ja= Japanese
 it= Italian
 nl= Dutch
 pt= Portuguese
 sv= Swedish
 tr= Turkish
 zh = Chinese

References 

Primary sources

General

External links
 Official website

 
Music schools in California
For-profit universities and colleges in the United States
For-profit music schools in the United States
Educational institutions established in 1977